Bjerrum may refer to:

People
 Niels Janniksen Bjerrum (1879 – 1958), was a Danish chemist (son of Jannik Petersen Bjerrum and father of Jannik Bjerrum).
 Jannik Bjerrum (1909 – 1992), was a Danish chemist (son of Niels Janniksen Bjerrum).
 Jannik Petersen Bjerrum (1851 – 1920), was a Danish ophthalmologist (father of Niels Janniksen Bjerrum).
 Kirstine Bjerrum Meyer (1861 – 1941), was a Danish physicist (sister of Jannik Petersen Bjerrum).

Other uses
 Bjerrum plot
 Bjerrum defect